Robert Guiscard (Modern ;  – 17 July 1085) was a Norman adventurer remembered for the conquest of southern Italy and Sicily. Robert was born into the Hauteville family in Normandy, went on to become count and then duke of Apulia and Calabria (1057–1059), Duke of Sicily (1059–1085), and briefly prince of Benevento (1078–1081) before returning the title to the papacy.

His sobriquet, in contemporary Latin  and Old French , is often rendered "the Resourceful", "the Cunning", "the Wily", "the Fox", or "the Weasel". In Italian sources he is often Roberto II Guiscardo or Roberto d'Altavilla (from Robert de Hauteville), while medieval Arabic sources call him simply Abārt al-dūqa (Duke Robert).

Background
From 999 to 1042 the Normans in Italy, coming first as pilgrims, were mainly mercenaries serving at various times the Byzantines and a number of Lombard nobles. The first of the independent Norman lords was Rainulf Drengot who established himself in the fortress of Aversa becoming Count of Aversa and Duke of Gaeta.

In 1038 there arrived William Iron Arm and Drogo, the eldest sons of Tancred of Hauteville, a petty noble of the Cotentin in Normandy. The two joined in the revolt of the Lombards against Byzantine control of Apulia. By 1040 the Byzantines had lost most of that province. In 1042 Melfi was chosen as the Norman capital, and in September of that year the Normans elected as their count William Iron-Arm, who was succeeded in turn by his brothers Drogo, comes Normannorum totius Apuliæ e Calabriæ ("the count of all Normans in Apulia and Calabria"), and Humphrey, who arrived about 1044.

Early years
Robert Guiscard was the sixth son of Tancred of Hauteville and eldest by his second wife Fressenda. According to the Byzantine historian Anna Comnena, he left Normandy with only five mounted riders and thirty followers on foot. Upon arriving in Langobardia in 1047, he became the chief of a roving robber-band. Anna Comnena also leaves a physical description of Guiscard:

Lands were scarce in Apulia at the time and the roving Guiscard could not expect any grant from Drogo, then reigning, for Humphrey had just received his own county of Lavello. Guiscard soon joined Prince Pandulf IV of Capua in his ceaseless wars with Prince Guaimar IV of Salerno (1048). The next year, however, Guiscard left Pandulf, according to Amatus of Montecassino because Pandulf reneged on a promise of a castle and his daughter's hand.  Guiscard returned to his brother Drogo and asked to be granted a fief. Drogo, who had just finished campaigning in Calabria, gave Guiscard command of the fortress of Scribla. Dissatisfied with this position, Guiscard moved to the castle of San Marco Argentano (after which he later named the first Norman castle in Sicily, at the site of ancient Aluntium).

During his time in Calabria, Guiscard married his first wife, Alberada of Buonalbergo.  She was the paternal aunt of Girard of Buonalbergo, who agreed to join Robert with 200 knights in exchange for Robert marrying her.

Guiscard soon rose to distinction. The Lombards turned against their erstwhile allies, and Pope Leo IX determined to expel the Norman freebooters. His army was defeated, however, at the Battle of Civitate sul Fortore in 1053 by the Normans, united under Humphrey. Humphrey commanded the centre against the pope's Swabian troops.  Early in the battle Count Richard of Aversa, commanding the right van, put the Lombards to flight and chased them down, then returned to help rout the Swabians.  Guiscard had come all the way from Calabria to command the left. His troops were held in reserve until, seeing Humphrey's forces ineffectually charging the pope's centre, he called up his father-in-law's reinforcements and joined the fray, distinguishing himself personally, even being dismounted and remounting again three separate times, according to William of Apulia. Honored for his actions at Civitate, Guiscard succeeded Humphrey as count of Apulia in 1057, over his elder half-brother Geoffrey. In company with Roger, his youngest brother, Guiscard carried on the conquest of Apulia and Calabria, while Richard conquered the principality of Capua.

Rule
Soon after his succession, probably in 1058, Guiscard separated from his wife Alberada because they were related within the prohibited degrees. Shortly after, he married Sichelgaita, the sister of Gisulf II of Salerno, Guaimar's successor.  In return for giving him his sister's hand, Gisulf demanded that Guiscard destroy two castles of his brother William, count of the Principate, which had encroached on Gisulf's territory.

The reformist Papacy, at odds with the Holy Roman Emperor (due to the Investiture Controversy) and the Roman nobility itself, resolved to recognize the Normans and secure them as allies. Therefore, in the Treaty of Melfi, on 23 August 1059, Pope Nicholas II invested Guiscard as duke of Apulia, Calabria, and Sicily. Guiscard, now "by the Grace of God and St Peter duke of Apulia and Calabria and, if either aid me, future lord of Sicily", agreed to hold his titles and lands by annual rent of the Holy See and to maintain its cause.  In the next twenty years he undertook a series of conquests, winning his Sicilian dukedom.

Subjugation of Calabria
At the time of the opening of the Melfitan council in June, Guiscard had been leading an army in Calabria, the first strong attempt to subjugate that Byzantine province since the campaigns of Iron-Arm with Guaimar.  After attending the synod for his investiture, Guiscard returned to Calabria, where his army was besieging Cariati.  After his arrival, Cariati submitted and, before winter was out, Rossano and Gerace followed.  Only Reggio was left in Byzantine hands when Guiscard returned to Apulia.  In Apulia, he worked to remove the Byzantine garrisons from Taranto and Brindisi, before, largely in preparation for his planned Sicilian expedition, he returned again to Calabria, where Roger was waiting with siege engines.

The fall of Reggio, after a long and arduous siege, and the subsequent capitulation of Scilla, an island citadel to which the Reggian garrison had fled, opened up the way to Sicily.  Roger first led a tiny force to attack Messina but was repulsed easily by the Saracen garrison.  The large invading force that could have been expected did not materialise, for Guiscard was recalled by a new Byzantine army, sent by Constantine X Doukas, ravaging Apulia. In January 1061, Melfi itself was under siege, and Roger too was recalled.  But the full weight of Guiscard's forces forced the Byzantines to retreat and by May Apulia was calm.

Sicilian campaigns

Guiscard invaded Sicily with his brother Roger, capturing Messina in 1061 with comparable ease: they landed unsighted during the night and surprised the Saracen army. This success gave them control over the Strait of Messina. Guiscard immediately fortified Messina and allied himself with Ibn al-Timnah, one of the rival emirs of Sicily, against Ibn al-Hawas, another emir.  The armies of Guiscard, his brother, and his Muslim friend marched into central Sicily by way of Rometta, which had remained loyal to al-Timnah.  They passed through Frazzanò and the pianura di Maniace, where George Maniakes and the first Hautevilles had distinguished themselves 21 years prior.  Guiscard assaulted the town of Centuripe, but resistance was strong, and he moved on. Paternò fell, and Guiscard brought his army to Enna (then Castrogiovanni), a formidable fortress.  The Saracens sallied forth and were defeated, but Enna itself did not fall.  Guiscard turned back, leaving a fortress at San Marco d'Alunzio, named after his first stronghold in Calabria.  He returned to Apulia with Sichelgaita for Christmas.

He returned in 1064, but bypassed Enna making straight for Palermo.  His campsite was infested with tarantulas, however, and had to be abandoned.  The campaign was unsuccessful, though a later campaign, in 1072, saw Palermo fall, and for the rest of Sicily it was only then a matter of time.  As a result of his Sicilian campaign, Guiscard was referred to as "Black Shirt Robert" because throughout the campaign he wore elegant clothing with imported dyes that ran together resulting in black clothing.

Against the Byzantines

Bari was reduced in April 1071, and Byzantine forces were finally ousted from southern Italy. The territory around Salerno was already held by Guiscard, and in December 1076 he took the city, expelling its Lombard prince Gisulf, whose sister Sichelgaita he had married. The Norman attacks on Benevento, a papal fief, alarmed and angered Pope Gregory VII.  Pressured by the emperor, Henry IV, Gregory VII turned again to the Normans, and at Ceprano in June 1080, he reinvested Guiscard, securing him also in the southern Abruzzi, while reserving Salerno.

In his last enterprise, Guiscard mounted an attack on the Byzantine Empire, taking up the cause of Raiktor, a monk pretending to be Michael VII, who had been deposed in 1078 and to whose son Guiscard's daughter had been betrothed. He sailed with 16,000 men, including 1,300 Norman knights, against the empire in May 1081. He defeated Emperor Alexius I Comnenus at the Battle of Dyrrhachium in October 1081, and by February 1082 he had occupied Corfu and Durazzo. He was recalled to the aid of Gregory VII, however, who was besieged in Castel Sant'Angelo by Henry IV, in June 1083. Also in 1083, Guiscard destroyed the town of Cannae, leaving only the cathedral and bishop's residence.
Guiscard was ally to kingdom of Duklja and Constantine Bodin. In 1081 he married his vassal's daughter Jaquinta of Bari to Bodin.

In May 1084, Guiscard marched north with 36,000 men, entered Rome, and forced Henry to retreat. A rebellion, or seditious tumult (émeute), of the citizens led to a three-day sack of the city, after which Guiscard escorted the pope to Rome. Guiscard's son Bohemund, for a time master of Thessaly, had now lost the Byzantine conquests. Guiscard returned with 150 ships to restore them, and he occupied Corfu and Kefalonia with the help of Ragusa and the Dalmatian cities (which were under the rule of Demetrius Zvonimir of Croatia). On 17 July 1085, Guiscard died of fever in Kefalonia, at Atheras, north of Lixouri, along with 500 Norman knights. He was buried in the Hauteville family mausoleum of the Abbey of the Santissima Trinità at Venosa. The town of Fiscardo on Kefalonia is named after him.

Guiscard was succeeded by Roger Borsa, his son by Sichelgaita, as Bohemund, his son by an earlier wife Alberada de Macon (aka Alberada of Buonalbergo), was set aside.  Guiscard left two younger sons: Guy of Hauteville and Robert Scalio, neither of whom made any trouble for their elder brothers. At his death Guiscard was duke of Apulia and Calabria, prince of Salerno, and suzerain of Sicily. His successes had been due not only to his great qualities but to the "entente" with the Papal See. He created and enforced a strong ducal power, which was nevertheless met by many baronial revolts, including one in 1078, when he demanded from the Apulian vassals an "aid" on the betrothal of his daughter. In conquering such wide territories he had little time to organize them internally. In the history of the Norman kingdom of Italy, Guiscard remains essentially the hero and founder, though his career ended in "something of a dead end," while his nephew Roger II was the statesman and organizer.

Religion
Due to his conquest of Calabria and Sicily, Guiscard was instrumental in bringing Latin Christianity to an area that had historically followed the Byzantine rite. Guiscard laid the foundation of the Salerno Cathedral and of a Norman monastery at Sant'Eufemia Lamezia in Calabria. This latter monastery, famous for its choir, began as a community of eleven monks from Saint-Evroul in Normandy under the abbot Robert de Grantmesnil.

Although his relationship with the pope was rocky, Guiscard preferred to be on good terms with the papacy, and he made a gesture of abandoning his first wife in response to church law. While the popes were often fearful of his growing power, they preferred the strong and independent hand of a Catholic Norman to the rule of a Byzantine Greek. Guiscard received his investment with Sicily at the hands of Pope Nicholas II, who feared the opposition of the Holy Roman Emperor to the Papal reforms more. Guiscard supported the reforms, coming to the rescue of a besieged Pope Gregory VII, who had once excommunicated him for encroaching on the territory of the Papal States. After the Great Schism of 1054, the polarized religious atmosphere served to strengthen Guiscard's alliance with papal forces, resulting in a formidable papal-Norman opposition to the Eastern Empire.

Depictions

In the Divine Comedy, Dante sees Guiscard's spirit in the Heaven of Mars, along with other "warriors of the faith" who exemplify the cardinal virtue of fortitude. In the Inferno, Dante describes Guiscard's enemies as a field of mutilated shades stretching out to the horizon.

Guiscard was the protagonist of Kleist's verse drama Robert Guiskard, incomplete at the author's death (1811).

Historical fiction novels covering the early years of the dynasty, from the arrival of the brothers in Italy to the conquest of Sicily, is covered in Jack Ludlow's trilogy Mercenaries, Warriors and Conquest.

Guiscard is a character in Alfred Duggan's novel Count Bohemond.

Marriage and issue
Married in 1051 to Alberada of Buonalbergo (1032 – aft. July 1122) and had:
 Bohemond.
 Emma (b. 1052 or after), married to Odo the Good Marquis

Married in 1058 or 1059 to Sichelgaita and had:
 Matilda (also Mahalta, Maud, or Maude); 1059 – aft. 1085), married Count Ramon Berenguer II of Barcelona.
 Roger Borsa, duke of Apulia and Calabria
 Mabile, married to William de Grandmesnil.
 Gersent, married to Count Hugh V of Maine, repudiated.
 Robert Scalio
 Guy, Byzantine sebastos
 Sibylla, married to Count Ebles II of Roucy and had 8 children.
 Olympias (renamed Helena), betrothed to Constantine Doukas, son of Michael VII in August 1074, contract broken off in 1078.

Notes

References

Sources
 von Kleist, Heinrich Robert Guiskard, Herzog der Normänner, student edition (Stuttgart, 2011).
 Chalandon, F. Histoire de la domination normande en Italie et en Sicile. (Paris, 1907).
 von Heinemann, L. Geschichte der Normannen in Unteritalien (Leipzig, 1894).
 Norwich, John Julius. The Normans in the South 1016–1130. Longmans: London, 1967.
 Chaplin, Danny. "Strenuitas: The Life and Times of Robert Guiscard and Bohemond of Taranto. Norman Power from the Mezzogiorno to Antioch, 1016–1111 AD"  (Singapore, 2015).

External links

 Medieval History Texts in Translation at Leeds University
 Coin with Guiscard's effigy.
 

1010s births
1085 deaths
Year of birth uncertain
Italo-Normans
Norman mercenaries
Norman warriors
Dukes of Apulia
People temporarily excommunicated by the Catholic Church
Counts of Apulia and Calabria
Hauteville family
Burials at the Abbey of Santissima Trinità, Venosa
People of the Byzantine–Norman wars
Nobilissimi